This is an NCAA Division I men's basketball alignment history. NCAA Division I is the highest level of competition in the National Collegiate Athletic Association, the main governing body for U.S. college sports.

For its first half-century of existence, the NCAA, founded in 1906 as the Intercollegiate Athletic Association of the United States and adopting its current name in 1910, was a single body for competitive purposes. It did not split into separate divisions for competition and governance purposes until 1956, when it established the University Division and College Division. In 1973, the University Division was renamed Division I, while the College Division was split into today's Divisions II and III. However, the NCAA now considers the 1947–48 season as the first in which an equivalent to today's Division I existed in basketball. This particular season was the first in which the Associated Press published college basketball rankings, with the news service choosing to publish separate rankings for what it called "major colleges" and "small colleges". The AP's "major colleges" of 1948 correspond directly to today's Division I, with "small colleges" corresponding to today's Divisions II and III.

Teams in italics are no longer in Division I. Seasons are listed by the calendar year in which they end—for example, if a school's first Division I season was the 1991–92 school year, it will be listed as having begun in 1992.

Dates used reflect when the school first became eligible for NCAA-sponsored postseason play—either the NCAA tournament for men or women, or the NIT since it was acquired by the NCAA in 2005. Note that it is possible for a school that is not eligible for NCAA postseason play to play in a tournament not operated by that organization. For example, South Dakota State's women's team, which was not eligible to compete in the NCAA tournament until 2009, played in the WNIT, which is not an NCAA-controlled tournament, in 2007 and 2008. Similarly, the Omaha men's team played in the 2014 CIT before becoming eligible for NCAA postseason play in 2016.

School names listed here reflect those in current use, which may or may not reflect names used in an institution's earlier history.

A
Abilene Christian 1971–1973, 2018–present
Air Force 1958–present
Akron 1948–1950, 1981–present
Alabama 1948–present
Alabama A&M 2000–present
Alabama State 1983–present
Albany 2000–present
Alcorn State 1978–present
American 1967–present
Appalachian State 1974–present
Arizona 1948, 1951–present
Arizona State 1951–present
Arkansas 1948–present
Arkansas–Pine Bluff 1999–present
Arkansas State 1971–present
Armstrong Atlantic 1983–1987
Army 1948–present
Auburn 1948–present
Augusta State 1984–1990
Augustana TBD
Austin Peay 1964–present

B
Baldwin Wallace 1948–1953
Ball State 1970–present
Baltimore 1979–1983
Baylor 1948–present
Bellarmine 2020–present
Belmont 2000–present
Bethune–Cookman 1981–present
Binghamton 2002–present
Birmingham–Southern 2004–2006
Boise State 1972–present
Boston College 1948–present
Boston University 1948–1949, 1958–present
Bowling Green 1948–present
Bradley 1948–present
Brooklyn 1948–1949, 1983–1992
Brown 1948–present
Bryant 2009–present
Bucknell 1948–present
Buffalo 1974–1977, 1992–present
Butler 1948–present
BYU 1948–present

C
California 1948–present
California Baptist 2018-present
Cal Poly 1995–present
Cal State Fullerton 1975–present
Cal State Los Angeles 1971–1975
Cal State Northridge 1991–present
Campbell 1978–present
Canisius 1948–present
Catholic 1977–1981
CCNY 1948–1953
Centenary (LA) 1960–2011
Central Arkansas 2011–present
Central Connecticut 1987–present
Central Michigan 1974–present
Charleston 1992–present
Charleston Southern 1975–present
Charlotte 1973–present
Chattanooga 1978–present
Chicago State 1985–present
Cincinnati 1948–present
Citadel 1948–present
Clemson 1948–present
Cleveland State 1973–present
Coastal Carolina 1987–present
Colgate 1948–present
Colorado 1948–present
Colorado State 1948–present
Columbia 1948–present
Coppin State 1986–present
Cornell 1948–present
Creighton 1948–56, 1960–present
CSU Bakersfield 2011–present

D
Dartmouth 1948–present
Davidson 1948–present
Dayton 1948–present
Delaware 1958–present
Delaware State 1974–present
Denver 1948–80, 1999–present
DePaul 1948–present
Detroit Mercy 1948–present
Drake 1948–present
Drexel 1974–present
Duke 1948–present
Duquesne 1948–present

E
East Carolina 1965–present
East Tennessee State 1959–present
Eastern Illinois 1982–present
Eastern Kentucky 1948, 1952–present
Eastern Michigan 1974–present
Eastern Washington 1984–present
Elon 2000–present
Evansville 1978–present

F
Fairfield 1965–present
Fairleigh Dickinson 1968–present
FIU 1988–present
Florida 1948–present
Florida A&M 1979–present
Florida Atlantic 1994–present
Florida Gulf Coast 2012–present
Florida State 1957–present
Fordham 1948–present
Fresno State 1956–1958, 1971–present
Furman 1948–present

G
Gardner–Webb 2003–present
George Mason 1979–present
George Washington 1948–present
Georgetown 1948–present
Georgia 1948–present
Georgia Southern 1974–present
Georgia State 1974–present
Georgia Tech 1948–present
Gettysburg 1948–51, 1959–73
Gonzaga 1953–present
Grambling 1978–present
Grand Canyon 2018–present
Green Bay 1982–present

H
Hamline 1948–48
Hampton 1996–present
Hardin–Simmons 1951–63, 1965–90
Hartford 1985–2023
Harvard 1948–present
Hawaii 1971–present
High Point 2000–present
Hofstra 1967–present
Holy Cross 1948–present
Houston 1951–present
Houston Baptist 1974–89, 2012–present
Howard 1974–present

I
Idaho 1948–present
Idaho State 1959–present
Illinois 1948–present
Incarnate Word 2018–present
Illinois State 1972–present
Indiana 1948–present
IUPUI 1999–present
Indiana State 1948, 1969–present
Iona 1954–present
Iowa 1948–present
Iowa State 1948–present

J
Jackson State 1978–present
Jacksonville 1967–present
Jacksonville State 1996–present
James Madison 1977–present
John Carroll 1948–55

K
Kansas 1948–present
Kansas City 1990–present
Kansas State 1948–present
Kennesaw State 2010–present
Kent State 1948, 1952–present
Kentucky 1948–52, 1954–present
Kentucky Wesleyan 1957–58

L
La Salle 1948–present
Lafayette 1948–present
Lamar 1970–present
Lawrence Tech 1948
Lehigh 1948–present
Liberty 1989–present
Lindenwood 2022–present
Lipscomb 2004–present
Little Rock 1979–present
LIU 1948–51, 1969–present
Long Beach State 1970–present
Longwood 2008–present
Louisiana 1972–73, 1976–present
Louisiana–Monroe 1974–present
Louisiana Tech 1974–present
Louisville 1948–present
Loyola Marymount 1950–present
Loyola–Chicago 1948–present
Loyola (LA) 1952–53, 1955–72
Loyola (MD) 1948–50, 1982–present
LSU 1948–present

M
Maine 1962–present
Manhattan 1948–present
Marist 1982–present
Marquette 1948–present
Marshall 1948, 1954–present
Maryland 1948–present
Maryland Eastern Shore 1974–75, 1982–present
Massachusetts 1962–present
McNeese State 1974–present
Memphis 1956–present
Mercer 1974–present
Merrimack 2019–present
Miami (FL) 1949–53, 1955–71, 1986–present
Miami (OH) 1948–present
Michigan 1948–present
Michigan State 1948–present
Middle Tennessee 1959–present
Milwaukee 1974–80, 1991–present
Minnesota 1948–present
Mississippi 1948–present
Mississippi State 1948–present
Mississippi Valley State 1980–present
Missouri 1948–present
Missouri State 1983–present
Monmouth 1984–present
Montana 1948, 1952–present
Montana State 1948, 1958–present
Morehead State 1956–present
Morgan State 1985–present
Morris Brown 2002–03
Mount Saint Mary's 1989–present
Muhlenberg 1948–63
Murray State 1954–present

N
Navy 1948–present
Nebraska 1948–present
Nevada 1948, 1970–present
New Hampshire 1962–present
NJIT 2010–present
New Mexico 1951–present
New Mexico State 1951–present
New Orleans 1976–present
Niagara 1948–present
Nicholls 1981–present
Norfolk State 1998–present
North Alabama 2018–present
North Carolina 1948–present
North Carolina Central 2012–present
North Carolina A&T 1974–present
North Carolina State 1948–present
North Dakota 2013–present
North Dakota State 2009–present
North Florida 2006–present
North Texas 1958–present
Northeastern 1973–present
Northeastern Illinois 1991–98
Northern Arizona 1951–53, 1972–present
Northern Colorado 1974–78, 2008–present
Northern Illinois 1968–present
Northern Iowa 1981–present
Northern Kentucky 2012–present
Northwestern 1948–present
Northwestern State 1977–present
Notre Dame 1948–present
NYU 1948–71; 1984

O
Oakland 2000–present
Ohio 1948–present
Ohio State 1948–present
Oklahoma 1948–present
Oklahoma City 1951–85
Oklahoma State 1948–present
Old Dominion 1977–present
Omaha 2016–present
Oral Roberts 1972–89, 1994–present
Oregon 1948–present
Oregon State 1948–present

P
Pacific 1954–present
Penn 1948–present
Penn State 1948–present
Pepperdine 1956–present
Pittsburgh 1948–present
Portland 1954–present
Portland State 1973–81, 1999–present
Prairie View A&M 1981–present
Presbyterian 2007–present
Princeton 1948–present
Providence 1949, 1958–present
Purdue 1948–present
Purdue Fort Wayne 2003–present

Q
Queens (NC) 2022–present
Quinnipiac 1999–present

R
Radford 1985–present
Regis 1962–64
Rhode Island 1948–present
Rice 1948–present
Richmond 1948–present
Rider 1968–present
Robert Morris 1977–present
Rutgers 1948–present

S
Sacramento State 1992–present
Sacred Heart 2000–present
St. Bonaventure 1948–present
St. Francis Brooklyn 1948–present
Saint Francis (PA) 1956–present
St. John's 1948–present
Saint Joseph's 1948–present
Saint Louis 1948–present
Saint Mary's 1948–present
Saint Peter's 1965–present
St. Thomas 2021–present
Sam Houston 1987–present
Samford 1973–present
San Diego 1980–present
San Diego State 1971–present
San Francisco 1948–82, 1986–present
San Jose State 1953–present
Santa Clara 1948–present
Savannah State 2003–19
Scranton 1948
Seattle 1953–80, 2010–present
Seton Hall 1948–present
Siena 1948–49, 1951–60, 1977–present
SMU 1948–present
South Alabama 1972–present
South Carolina 1948–present
South Carolina State 1974–present
South Carolina Upstate 2008–present
South Dakota 2011–present
South Dakota State 2010–present
South Florida 1974–present
Southeast Missouri State 1992–present
Southeastern Louisiana 1981–89, 1991–present
Southern U. 1978–present
Southern California 1948–present
Southern Illinois 1968–present
Southern Indiana 2022–present
SIU Edwardsville 2013–present
Southern Mississippi 1969, 1973–present
Southern Utah 1989–present
Stanford 1948–present
Stephen F. Austin 1987–present
Stetson 1972–present
Stonehill 2022–present
Stony Brook 2000–present
Syracuse 1948–present

T
Tarleton 2020–present
TCU 1948–present
Temple 1948–present
Tennessee 1948–present
Tennessee–Martin 1993–present
Tennessee State 1978–present
Tennessee Tech 1956–present
Texas 1948–present
Texas A&M 1948–present
Texas A&M–Commerce 2022–present
Texas A&M–Corpus Christi 1973, 2003–present
Texas–Arlington 1969–present
Texas Southern 1978–present
Texas State 1985–present
Texas Tech 1951–present
Texas Wesleyan 1948
Toledo 1948–present
Towson 1980–present
Trinity (TX) 1971–73
Troy 1994–present
Tulane 1948–85, 1990–present
Tulsa 1948–present

U
UAB 1979–present
UC Davis 2005–present
UC Irvine 1978–present
UC Riverside 2001–present
UC Santa Barbara 1964–present
UCSD 2020–present
UCF 1985–present
UCLA 1948–present
UConn 1948, 1952–present
UIC 1982–present
UMass Lowell 2013–present
UMBC 1987–present
UNC Asheville 1985–present
UNC Greensboro 1992–present
UNC Wilmington 1977–present
UNLV 1970–present
U.S. International 1982–1991
Utah 1948–present
Utah State 1948–present
Utah Tech 2020–present
Utah Valley 2010–present
UTEP 1951–present
Utica 1982–87
UTRGV 1969–present
UTSA 1982–present

V
Valparaiso 1948–50, 1979–present
Vanderbilt 1948–present
VCU 1974–present
Vermont 1962–present
Villanova 1948–present
Virginia 1948–present
VMI 1948–present
Virginia Tech 1948–present

W
Wagner 1977–present
Wake Forest 1948–present
Washington 1948–present
Washington-St. Louis 1948–50, 1954–60
Washington & Lee 1948–59
Washington State 1948–present
Wayne State (NE) 1948–50
Weber State 1964–present
West Chester 1974–82
West Texas A&M 1951–86
West Virginia 1948–present
Western Carolina 1977–present
Western Illinois 1982–present
Western Kentucky 1948–present
Western Michigan 1948–present
Western Reserve 1948–1955
Wichita State 1948–present
William & Mary 1948–present
Winston-Salem State 2008–10
Winthrop 1987–present
Wisconsin 1948–present
Wofford 1996–present
Wright State 1988–present
Wyoming 1948–present

X
Xavier 1948–present

Y
Yale 1948–present
Youngstown State 1948, 1982–present

See also
NCAA Division I Football Bowl Subdivision alignment history
NCAA Division I Football Championship Subdivision alignment history

References 

College basketball in the United States lists
NCAA Division I lists
NCAA Division I basketball